Five Have a Mystery to Solve is a 6-part 1964 British film serial made by the Children's Film Foundation, based on the novel of the same name by Enid Blyton.

Cast
David Palmer as Julian
Darryl Read as Dick
Mandy Harper as George (as Amanda Coxell)
Paula Boyd as Anne
Michael Wennink as Wilfred
Michael Balfour as Emilio
Robin Hunter as Carlo
Keith Pyott as Sir Hugo Blaize
Grace Arnold		
Howard Douglas		
Diane Powell as Sally

Critical reception
DVD Beaver called it "tremendously entertaining."

References

External links
 

1964 films
Children's Film Foundation
1960s mystery films
Films based on children's books
Adaptations of works by Enid Blyton
Films directed by Ernest Morris
1960s British films